Harold Rainsford Stark (November 12, 1880 – August 20, 1972) was an officer in the United States Navy during World War I and World War II, who served as the 8th Chief of Naval Operations from August 1, 1939 to March 26, 1942.

Early life and career
Stark enrolled in the United States Naval Academy in 1899 and graduated with the class of 1903. As a plebe there he received the nickname "Betty". From 1907 to 1909, Stark served on the battleship  before and during the United States Atlantic Fleet's cruise around the world.

World War I
Subsequently, Stark had extensive duty in torpedo boats and destroyers, including command of the Asiatic Fleet's torpedo flotilla in 1917, when these old and small destroyers steamed from the Philippines to the Mediterranean to join in World War I operations. Stark served on the staff of Commander, United States Naval Forces operating in Europe from November 1917 to January 1919.

Interwar years

During the later 1920s and into the mid-1930s, with the rank of captain, Stark was successively Chief of Staff to the Commander, Destroyer Squadrons Battle Fleet, Aide to the Secretary of the Navy, and Commanding Officer of USS West Virginia. From 1934 to 1937, Rear Admiral Stark was Chief of the Bureau of Ordnance. Then from July 1938, he served at sea as Commander Cruiser Division Three and Commander of Cruisers in the Battle Fleet, with the rank of vice admiral.

Chief of Naval Operations and beginning of World War II

In August 1939, Stark became Chief of Naval Operations (CNO) with the rank of admiral. In that position, he oversaw the expansion of the navy during 1940 and 1941, and its involvement in the Neutrality Patrols against German submarines in the Atlantic during the latter part of 1941. It was at this time that he authored the Plan Dog memo, which laid the basis for America's Europe first policy. He also orchestrated the navy's change to adopting unrestricted submarine warfare in case of war with Japan; Stark expressly ordered it at 17:52 Washington time on 7 December 1941, not quite four hours after the Japanese attack on Pearl Harbor. It appears the decision was taken without the knowledge or prior consent of the government. It violated the London Naval Treaty, to which the United States was signatory.

After Pearl Harbor
As CNO, Stark oversaw combat operations against Japan and the European Axis Powers that officially began in December 1941.

In March 1942, Stark was relieved as CNO by Admiral Ernest King. He went to Britain the next month to become Commander of United States Naval Forces Europe.

From his London headquarters, Stark directed the naval part of the great buildup in England and US naval operations and training activities on the European side of the Atlantic. He received the additional title of Commander of the Twelfth Fleet in October 1943, and he supervised USN participation in the landings in Normandy, France, in June 1944. Stark built and maintained close relations with British civilian and naval leaders, who "generally adored him," and also with the leaders of other Allied powers. Stark was particularly important in dealing with Charles de Gaulle; it was thanks to Stark that the US-British-Free French relationship continued to work. He earned high praise from Admiral King for his work.

After the Normandy landings, Stark faced a Court of Inquiry over his actions leading up to Pearl Harbor. The Court concluded that Stark had not conveyed the danger or provided enough information to Kimmel but that he had not been derelict. Secretary of the Navy James Forrestal had ordered the 1944 Board of Inquiry, Upon reviewing the report, Forrestal felt that the court had been too lenient in assigning blame for the disaster. The court had found that the Army and Navy had adequately cooperated in the defense of Pearl Harbor; there had been no information indicating that Japanese carriers were on their way to attack Pearl Harbor; and the attack had succeeded principally because of the aerial torpedo, a secret weapon whose use could not have been predicted.

Forrestal disapproved all of those findings and judged that Kimmel could have done more with the information he had had to prevent or mitigate the attack. Forrestal concluded that both Kimmel and Stark had "failed to demonstrate the superior judgment necessary for exercising command commensurate with their rank and their assigned duties."
King's endorsement of the report was scalding, leading to Stark being relieved.

In 1948, King reconsidered and requested that the endorsement be expunged: "It was the only time that King ever admitted he had been wrong."  The controversy surrounding him persisted after his death.

Stark's most controversial service involved the growing menace of Japanese forces in the period before America was bombed into the war by the attack on Pearl Harbor. The controversy centers on whether he and his Director of War Plans Admiral Richmond K. Turner provided sufficient information to Admiral Husband E. Kimmel, Commander of the Pacific Fleet at Pearl Harbor, about Japanese moves in the fall of 1941 to enable Kimmel to anticipate an attack and to take steps to counter it. Captain (later Rear Admiral) Edwin T. Layton was Kimmel's chief intelligence officer (later also Admiral Chester W. Nimitz's intelligence officer) at the time of the attack. In his book, And I Was There:  Pearl Harbor and MidwayBreaking the Secrets (1985), Layton maintained that Stark offered meaningless advice throughout the period; withheld vital information at the insistence of his Director of War Plans, Admiral Turner; showed timidity in dealing with the Japanese; and utterly failed to provide anything of use to Kimmel. John Costello (Layton's co-author), in Days of Infamy (Pocket, 1994), points out that Douglas MacArthur had complete access to both PURPLE and JN-25, with over eight hours warning, and was still caught by surprise.

Moreover, as the Supreme Commander of the Allied Powers official historian Gordon Prange and his colleagues note in December 7, 1941 (McGraw-Hill, 1988), the defense of the fleet was General Walter C. Short's responsibility, not Kimmel's. Turner's insistence on having intelligence go through War Plans led Office of Naval Intelligence to a wrong belief that it was only to collect intelligence. Turner did not correct his view or aid Stark in understanding the problem. Among others, Morison and Layton agree that Turner was most responsible for the debacle, as does Ned Beach in Scapegoats (Annapolis, 1995).

In addition, there was considerable confusion over where Japan might strike: the United States, the Soviet Union, or British colonies in Asia and the Far East.

Postwar

From August 1945 until he left active duty in April 1946, Stark served in Washington, D.C., and  made his home there after retirement. He died in 1972 and was buried at Arlington National Cemetery.

Stark maintained a family summer residence on Lake Carey in Tunkhannock, Pennsylvania, north of his native Wilkes-Barre, for many years and flew in by naval seaplane for weekends during his career. The cottage still stands on the western shore of the lake.

Awards
 Navy Distinguished Service Medal – three awards
 Army Distinguished Service Medal
 Navy Expeditionary Medal
 Mexican Service Medal
 World War I Victory Medal
 American Defense Service Medal with "FLEET" clasp
 American Campaign Medal
 European-African-Middle Eastern Campaign Medal with one battle star
 World War II Victory Medal
 Honorary Knight Grand Cross of the Order of the British Empire (United Kingdom)
 Commander, Legion of Honor (France)
 Croix de Guerre 1939-1945 with palm (France)

Legacy
The frigate  was named in honor of Stark. Stark Learning Center, a major instructional facility at Wilkes University in Wilkes-Barre, PA, was also named in his honor, as was research and development laboratory and office building at the Naval Surface Warfare Center Dahlgren Division.

Stark was portrayed by actor Edward Andrews in the 1970 film Tora! Tora! Tora!.

References

External links

 
 Harold R Stark at ArlingtonCemetery.net, an unofficial website 
 

1880 births
1972 deaths
Recipients of the Distinguished Service Medal (US Army)
People from Wilkes-Barre, Pennsylvania
United States Navy personnel of World War I
United States Navy World War II admirals
United States Navy admirals
United States Naval Academy alumni
Chiefs of Naval Operations
Naval War College alumni
Burials at Arlington National Cemetery
Recipients of the Navy Distinguished Service Medal
Military personnel from Pennsylvania
Honorary Knights Grand Cross of the Order of the British Empire